Britannia Industries Limited is an Indian company specialised in food industry, part of the Wadia Group headed by Nusli Wadia. Founded in 1892 and headquartered in Kolkata, it is one of India's oldest existing companies and best known for its biscuit products. The company sells its Britannia and Tiger brands of biscuits, breads and dairy products throughout India and abroad. Beginning with the circumstances of its takeover by the Wadia Group in the early 1990s, the company has been mired in several controversies connected to its management. However, it still has a large market share and it is profitable.

History
The company was established in 1892 by a group of British businessmen with an initial investment of 295. Initially, biscuits were manufactured in a small house in central Kolkata. Later, the enterprise was acquired by the Gupta brothers, mainly Nalin Chandra Gupta, an attorney, and operated under the name, V.S. Brothers. In 1918, C.H. Holmes, an English businessman based in Kolkata, was taken on as a partner and The Britannia Biscuit Company Limited (BBCo) was launched. The Mumbai factory was set up in 1924 and Peek Freans UK, acquired a controlling interest in BBCo. During the Second World War, the government of British India needed a continuous supply of biscuits for British soldiers. The Britannia Biscuit Company started supplying biscuits to British Army for several years, and the company sometimes devoted 95% of its capacity to produce biscuits for the armed forces. Biscuits were in high demand during World War II, which gave a boost to the company's sales. The company name was changed to the current Britannia Industries Limited in 1979. In 1982, the American company Nabisco Brands, Inc. acquired the parent of Peek Freans and became a major foreign shareholder. In 1978, Britannia came out with its public issue, and its Indian shareholding had increased to 62%, which firmly established Britannia as an Indian company. The 38% foreign stake was owned by the UK-based Associated Biscuits International Limited (ABIL).

In 1993, textile tycoon Nusli Wadia of Bombay Dyeing took control of the company from Britannia's then-chairman Rajan Pillai, with the help of French food giant Danone. In 2009, Wadia Group became the largest shareholder in BIL after acquiring a 25% stake owned by Group Danone.

In December 2018, it launched a new category, Treat Crème Wafers.

Britannia acquired a controlling stake in Kenya's Kenafric Biscuits in October 2022. In September 2022, Varun Berry was appointed as Executive Vice-Chairman and Managing Director of Britannia Industries Limited and Ranjeet Kohli was also appointed as Executive Director and CEO. As of December 2022, Britannia Industries Limited had a market capitalization of Rs. 1,08,992.90 crore.

In December 2022, Britannia Industries entered into a joint venture agreement with Bel SA of France and Britannia Dairy Private Limited (BDPL) to develop, manufacture and sell cheese products in India and other markets. Under the joint venture, Bel SA acquired a 49% stake in BDPL, a subsidiary of Britannia Industries, for 262 crore and infused an additional 215 crore in the joint venture.

In August 2022, the company expanded its product portfolio by entering the Western Snacking market with the launch of its new product, Treat Croissant. It also released a TV commercial featuring choreographer, actor and director, Prabhu Deva.

Businesses
The company's principal activity is the manufacture and sale of biscuits, bread, rusk, cakes and dairy products.

Biscuits
The company's factories have an annual capacity of 433,000 tonnes. The brand names of Britannia's biscuits include VitaMarieGold, Tiger, Nutrichoice, Good Day, 50 50, Treat, Pure Magic, Milk Bikis, Bourbon, Nice Time and Little Hearts among others. 

In 2006, Tiger, the mass market brand, realised $150.75 million in sales, including exports to the U.S. and Australia. This amounts to 20% of Britannia's revenues for that year.

Britannia Industries has roped in Bollywood actor Salman Khan to endorse its range of 'Tiger' brand of biscuits. According to Britannia, Khan will play a role in further enhancing Tiger's core values through his association in presenting the brand, its products and promotional activities.

Dairy products
Dairy products contribute close to 10% to Britannia's revenue. The company not only markets dairy products to the public but also trades dairy commodities business-to-business. Its dairy portfolio grew to 47% in 2000-01 and by 30% in 2001-02. Its main competitors are Nestlé India, the National Dairy Development Board (NDDB), and Amul (GCMMF).

Britannia holds an equity stake in Dynamix Dairy and outsources the bulk of its dairy products from its associate.

On 27 October 2001, Britannia announced a joint venture with Fonterra Co-operative Group of New Zealand, an integrated dairy company which handles all aspects of the value chain from procurement of milk to making value-added products such as cheese and buttermilk. Britannia intends to source most of the products from New Zealand, which they would market in India. The joint venture will allow technology transfer to Britannia. Britannia and New Zealand Dairy each hold 49% of the JV, and the remaining 2 percent will be held by a strategic investor. Britannia has also tentatively announced that its dairy business (probably including Dynamix) would be transferred to the joint venture. However, the authorities' approval to the joint venture obliged the company to start manufacturing facilities of its own. It would not be allowed to trade, except at the wholesale level, thus pitching it in competition with Danone, which had recently established its own dairy business.

Performance and profitability
Between 1998 and 2001, the company's sales grew at a compound annual rate of 16% against the market, and operating profits reached 18%. More recently, the company has been growing at 27% a year, compared to the industry's growth rate of 20%. At present, 90% of Britannia's annual revenue of 22 billion comes from biscuits. Britannia is one of India's 100 Most Trusted brands listed in The Brand Trust Report.
Britannia has an estimated market share of 38%.

Disputes and controversies

Wadia and Rajan Pillai
Kerala businessman Rajan Pillai secured control of the group in the late 1980s, becoming known in India as the 'Biscuit Raja'. In 1993, the Wadia Group acquired a stake in Associated Biscuits International (ABIL), and became an equal partner with Groupe Danone in Britannia Industries Limited.

In what The Economic Times referred to as one of [India's] most dramatic corporate sagas, Pillai ceded control to Wadia and Danone after a bitter boardroom struggle, then fled his Singapore base to India in 1995 after accusations of defrauding Britannia, and died the same year in Tihar Jail.

Wadia and Danone
The Wadias' Kalabakan Investments and Group Danone had two equal joint venture companies, Wadia BSN and United Kingdom registered Associated Biscuits International Holdings Ltd., which together held a 51 percent stake in Britannia. The ABIH tranche was acquired in 1992, while the controlling stake held by Wadia BSN was acquired in 1995. It was agreed that, in case of a deadlock between the partners, Danone was obliged to buy the Wadia BSN stake at a "fair market value". ABIH had a separate agreement signed in 1992 and was subject to British law.

Wadia was to be Danone's partner in the food and dairy business, and product launches from Groupe Danone's were expected but never materialised despite the JV being in existence for over 11 years in India. Under the 1995 joint venture agreement, Danone is prohibited from launching food brands within India without the consent of the Wadias. In addition, the partners agreed there would be the right of first refusal to buy out the remaining partner in the event of the other wishing to sell its holding.

In June 2006, Wadia claimed Danone had used the Tiger brand to launch biscuits in Bangalore. In May 2007, Nusli Wadia told the Ministry of Commerce and Industry that Danone invested in a Bangalore-based bio nutrition company, Avesthagen, in October 2006 in violation of the government's Press Note 1, 2005, which requires a foreign company to obtain the consent of its Indian joint venture partner before pursuing an independent business in a similar area, including joint ventures based purely on technical collaboration. Danone argued that Press Note 1 did not apply to it as it did not have a formal technology transfer or trademark agreement with Avesthagen, and that its 25% holding in Britannia was indirect. Wadia also filed a case in the Bombay High Court for a breach of a non-competition clause in that connection. The court ordered Danone not to alienate, encumber or sell shares of Avesthagen.

In September 2007, the Foreign Investment Promotion Board of India rejected Danone's claims that it did not need a non-compete waiver from the Wadias to enter into business in India alone.

After a prolonged legal battle, Danone agreed to sell its 25.48% stake in Britannia to Leila Lands, which is a Wadia group entity based in Mauritius, and quit this line of business. The deal was valued at $175–200 million. With this buy-out, Wadia holds a majority stake of 50.96%.

Intellectual property dispute
In a separate dispute from the shareholder matters, the company alleged in 2006 that Danone had violated its intellectual property rights in the Tiger brand by registering and using Tiger in several countries without its consent. Britannia claimed the company found out that Danone had launched the Tiger brand in Indonesia in 1998, and later in Malaysia, Singapore, Pakistan and Egypt, when it attempted to register the Tiger trademark in some of these countries in 2004. Whilst it was initially reported in December 2006 that agreement had been reached, it was reported in September 2007 that a solution remained elusive. In the meantime since Danone's biscuit business has been taken over by Kraft, the Tiger brand of biscuits in Malaysia was renamed Kraft Tiger Biscuits in September 2008.

Britannia initiated legal action against Danone in Singapore in September 2007. The dispute was resolved in 2009 with Britannia securing rights to the Tiger brand worldwide, and Danone paying ₹220 million to utilise the brand.

Partnership 
In March 2017, it formed a joint venture with Greek firm Chipita SA for producing and selling ready-to-eat croissants in India. In September 2021, the company partnered with Accenture to facilitate procurement, accelerate innovation and improve customer and supplier experience by digitizing the company's manufacturing units and warehouses. During the COVID-19 pandemic in India, it tied up with personal concierge startup Dunzo to deliver essential goods at the customer's doorstep in April 2020.

Financials 
Britannia Industries registered consolidated revenue of 13,731.05 crore in FY 2022. The company registered consolidated revenue of 12,883 crore, a growth of 13% in FY 2021, from 11,444 crore in FY 2020. The company reported a 21% growth in its net profit at 1,402.63 crore for the financial year ended in March 31, 2020. It registered a net profit of 1,159.12 crore in FY19. The company's consolidated income grew by 5.48% to 11,878.95 crore in FY20 compared to 11,261.12 crore in the fiscal year 2019.

CSR 
The company has been engaged in various social and philanthropical activities. It has joined the United Nations Global Compact, the world's largest sustainability initiative, and has aligned with the UN Sustainable Development Goals (SDGs). It supports the maritime insurance industry and provides assistance to shipowners in developing transitional methods to achieve the objectives of the Paris Agreement. Britannia P&I is an associate member of the International Maritime Rescue Federation.

It runs a non-profit Britannia Nutrition Foundation that advocates better child nutrition and addresses child malnutrition issues in India.

Awards and recognition 
 In 2022, the company ranked 4th in the list of India's most chosen FMCG brands, as per Kantar India's annual Brand Footprint report.
 Britannia won the Global Sustainability Leadership Awards by the World Sustainability Congress in 2021.
 The Economic Times listed the company's Good Day biscuit brand as the Brand Equity’s Most Trusted Brands of Indians in 2019-20.
 The company was selected for special recognition under the Leading RE Investor category at Renewable Energy India Awards 2016.
 In 2014, the company was voted as Reader's Digest Trusted Brand in India under the food and beverage category, part of the Reader's Digest Trusted Brand Survey.
 In 2014, The Economic Times ranked the company at 11 in the 100 Most Trusted Brands of India list 2014.
 The company was listed in India's Most Attractive Brands 2013 in a TRA Brand Trust Report survey.
 It was awarded the Global Performance Excellence Award (GPEA) by Asia Pacific Quality Organization (APQO) in June 2012.
 It was ranked #2 in the Brand Equity's Most Trusted Brands survey by The Economic Times.
 In 2012, Britannia received the Golden Peacock National Quality Award – 2012 under the FMCG category.
 In 2011, Britannia won the Indian Merchants' Chamber (IMC)'s Ramkrishna Bajaj National Quality Award.
 In 2011, the company received the CII's National Award for Food Safety 2011 in the category of 'Large Food Businesses - Manufacturing' by the Confederation of Indian Industry.
 According to The Economic Times' Brand Equity Survey, the brand was ranked 5th in the top 10 most trusted brands list in India in 2010 and 2nd in 2012. in India's top 10 most trusted brands list.

Sponsorship
 Indian Super League 2018–present

See also

 Parle Products
 Wahaha Joint Venture Company

References

External links

 

Food and drink companies of India
Groupe Danone brands
Companies based in Bangalore
Food and drink companies established in 1892
Indian brands
Indian companies established in 1892
NIFTY 50
Wadia Group
Companies listed on the National Stock Exchange of India
Companies listed on the Bombay Stock Exchange
Indian companies established in 1918